Talwandi Sabo is a town and Municipal Council in Bathinda district, Punjab, India. It is famous for being one of the five Takhts of Sikhism (Sikh Religious Places), Takht Sri Damdama Sahib. It is also famous for its Baisakhi, which is celebrated on 13 April every year.

Demographics
Talwandi Sabo consists of 13 wards and as of 2011 it has a total population of 20,589 with 11,062 males and 9,527 females.

Gurdwaras at Takht Sri Damdama Sahib 
 Takht Sri Damdama Sahib
 Gurdwara Manji Sahib Sri Guru Tegh Bahadur
 Gurdwara Manji Sahib Padshahi Nauvin and Dasvin
 Gurdwara Likhansar Sahib
 Gurdwara Jandsar Sahib
 Gurdwara Mahallsar Sahib
 Gurdwara Sri Nanaksar Sahib
 Gurdwara Damdama Sahib Padshahi Dasvin
 Gurdwara Mata Sundar Kaur and Sahib Kaur ji
 Gurdwara Baba Bir Singh Baba Dhir Singh Ji
 Gurdwara Bunga Mastuana Sahib
 Bhora Saheed Baba Deep Singh JI 
 Burj Baba Deep Singh ji
 Gurudwara Dag Sar Sahib

Universities and colleges in Talwandi Sabo

Government
 Guru Kashi College  (Established in year 1964)
 Punjabi University Guru Kashi Campus
 University School of Business Studies, Punjabi University
 Yadavindra College of Engineering, Punjabi University

Private
 Akal University, established by Baru Sahib Trust
 Guru Kashi University

Schools in Talwandi Sabo
 Akal Academy
 Khalsa Senior Secondary School (Boys)
 Khalsa Senior Secondary School (Girls)
Saint Soldier Rational Public Senior Secondary School
 Sri Dasmesh Senior Secondary Public School
 Tara Convent School
 Tagore Public Senior Secondary School 
 The sanskar school
 Universal Public School
Sudesh Vatika - A Senior Secondary C.B.S.E.School

See also
 Guru Gobind Singh Refinery
 Talwandi Sabo Power Project

References

Cities and towns in Bathinda district